H. hirta  may refer to:
 Hirtopelta hirta, a sea snail species
 Hydrangea hirta, a flowering plant species
 Hyparrhenia hirta, a grass species

See also
 Hirta (disambiguation)